Archery competitions at the 1979 Pan American Games in San Juan were held from July 2 to 6 at the Archery Range in the University of Puerto Rico. Archery was included for the first time at the Pan American Games.

Venue
The competitions took place at the Archery Range located on the campus of the University of Puerto Rico.

Medal table

Medalists

Participating nations
A total of 11 countries qualified athletes.

See also
Archery at the 1980 Summer Olympics

References

 Sports 123

1979 Pan American Games
P
1979